Albano Aleksi (born 10 October 1992) is an Albanian football player who plays as a midfielder for Tirana  in Albanian Superliga.

Club career

Butrinti Sarandë
Aleksi made his league debut for the Albanian First Division club on 9 March 2013 in a 1-1 away draw with Besëlidhja Lezhë. He was subbed on for Shkëlzen Dalipaj in the 88th minute.

Luftëtari Gjirokastër
In Summer 2015, Aleksi moved to then Albanian First Division club Luftëtari Gjirokastër. He made his league debut for the club on 12 September 2015 in a 2-0 away victory over Dinamo Tirana. He was subbed on for Fejzo Shenaj in the 63rd minute. He scored his first league goal for the club around a month later, in a 2-1 win over Lushnja on 17 October 2015. His goal, scored in the 34th minute, made the score 1-0 in favor of Luftëtari. He played all ninety minutes of the match.

Statistics
As of 30 November 2015

Honours
Luftëtari
Albanian First Division (1): 2015–16
Teuta
Albanian Superliga (1): 2020-21
Albanian Cup (1): 2019-20
Albanian Supercup (2): 2020,2021
Tirana
 Albanian Supercup (1)  :2022

Notes

References

1992 births
Living people
Sportspeople from Fier
Association football midfielders
Albanian footballers
KF Butrinti players
Luftëtari Gjirokastër players
KF Teuta Durrës players
Kategoria e Parë players
Kategoria Superiore players